Clay Thompson Buckingham (born June 8, 1927) is a United States Army major general who served as Assistant Chief of Staff for Automation and Communications/Assistant Deputy Chief of Staff for Operations (Command & Control, Communications, Computers) of the United States Army from 1979 to 1982. He graduated from the United States Military Academy in 1949.

References

1927 births
Living people
United States Army generals